Nishtun is a coastal town in southeastern Yemen.

Nishtun is one of Al Mahrah Governorate In Al Ghaydah District with the population of 1165 people.

Populated places in Al Mahrah Governorate
Populated coastal places in Yemen